The Mississippi Forestry Commission (MFC) is a State Agency in Mississippi with headquarters in Jackson.  The Forestry Commission was authorized to:  The agency was created in 1926.

Mission
The mission of the Mississippi Forestry Commission is:

Program areas
The Mississippi Forestry Commission has two major program areas:  
Forest Protection and Information
	This program area is concerned with protection of the state's forestlands from wildfire, as well as, the detection, evaluation, and control of forest pests that include insects, diseases, and invasive plants.

Mississippi Institute for Forest Inventory and Forest Management
	This program area provides an assessment of statewide forest resources using geographic information systems to estimate forest removals, regeneration, and development of forest cover.  The agency manages two state forests (Kurtz and Camden) and the state's forested 16th Section School Trust Lands.

Organizational structure
There is a ten-member Board of Commissioners appointed by the Governor of Mississippi.

The agency is under the direction of a State Forester with five Departments (Business Support, Forest Information, Forest Management, Forest Protection, and Forest Health).

There are four administrative regions in Mississippi. Each region is staffed by a Regional Forester, with either 6 or 7 Area Foresters assigned to individual regions.

16th Section Lands
The Mississippi Forestry Commission provides resource management on the state's 480,000 acres of forested 16th Section School Trust Lands in a cooperative arrangement with the Mississippi Secretary of State and local school districts.  For some school districts in Mississippi, revenues from 16th Section timber sales and associated hunting and fishing leases have been their only source of funds.

References

External links
 Mississippi Forestry Commission

State agencies of Mississippi
State forestry agencies in the United States
Government agencies established in 1926
1926 establishments in Mississippi